Florida State Road 674 (SR 674) begins in Ruskin, Hillsborough County, Florida. The road runs east/west and is also known as College Avenue and Sun City Center Boulevard.

Route description

Major intersections

References

External links

Florida Route Log (SR 674)

674
674
674